Edward Michael Kasko (June 27, 1931 – June 24, 2020) was an American infielder, manager, scout and front office executive in Major League Baseball (MLB).

Kasko was born in Elizabeth, New Jersey, and raised in nearby Linden. He graduated from Linden High School in 1949.

Standout defensive player
A standout defensive player as a shortstop and third baseman, he began his professional career in 1949. After six years in minor league baseball and two in the military at the time of the Korean War, Kasko played for ten MLB seasons (1957–66) with the St. Louis Cardinals, Cincinnati Reds, Houston Colt .45s / Astros and Boston Red Sox. He led National League third basemen in fielding percentage in 1960 and NL shortstops in that category four years later.

A right-handed batter, Kasko had a career batting average of .264 in 1,077 games and 3,546 at bats. His 935 Major League hits included 146 doubles and 13 triples, as well as 22 home runs. Selected to the 1961 National League All-Star team, he appeared in that year's second all-star classic, played July 31 at Fenway Park. In the contest, a 1–1 tie shortened by rain, Kasko replaced starter Maury Wills at shortstop in the fourth inning and singled off Don Schwall of the Red Sox in the sixth frame to help the Senior Circuit score the tying run. Hall of Fame shortstop Ernie Banks pinch-hit for Kasko in the eighth inning and replaced him in the field.

Kasko appeared in one World Series—also in 1961, with Cincinnati. He started all five games (the New York Yankees defeated the Reds, four games to one) at shortstop, led the Reds with seven hits (all singles), scored one run, and batted .318. Defensively, he made one error in 27 chances in the field and participated in five double plays.

Managing career
After the 1966 season, his only campaign with Boston, Kasko retired as an active player and managed the Red Sox' Triple-A clubs, the Toronto Maple Leafs (1967) and Louisville Colonels (1968–69), to a cumulative 213–213 record and one playoff berth.

He succeeded the popular Dick Williams as Red Sox manager in 1970, and guided the club through 1973. The Red Sox finished above the .500 mark each season, but only contended in 1972 when they finished a half-game out of first place, behind the Detroit Tigers, in the American League East Division. The half-game differential was due to the brief players' strike that spring: between six and eight games were lopped off each club's schedule and it was agreed that lost games would not be "made up" to resolve pennant races.

During Kasko's four-year managerial term, he incorporated young players such as Carlton Fisk and Dwight Evans into the Red Sox lineup, converted relief pitcher Bill Lee into a successful starter, and showed patience with sore-armed veteran Luis Tiant as he returned to form. But when the 1973 Red Sox again could not measure up to the powerful Baltimore Orioles of the era, Kasko was reassigned to an executive scouting position within the organization and replaced as manager by Darrell Johnson upon season's end on September 30. His final record with Boston, over four seasons, was 345–295 (.539).

Managerial record

Scouting director
Kasko remained with the Red Sox for another two decades as a scout (1974–77), director of scouting (1977–92) and vice president, baseball development (1992–94). While he was scouting director, the Red Sox drafted and signed impactful players like Roger Clemens, Marty Barrett, Ellis Burks, Mike Greenwell, John Valentin, Tim Naehring, Jeff Bagwell, Curt Schilling, Brady Anderson and Mo Vaughn, although Bagwell, Anderson and Schilling became stars for other teams after Boston traded them for veteran talent. Kasko was named to the Boston Red Sox Hall of Fame in 2010.

He died in Richmond, Virginia, his longtime adopted home city, at age 88 on June 24, 2020.

References
The Baseball Encyclopedia, Macmillan Books, 10th edition.

External links

1931 births
2020 deaths
Baltimore Orioles (IL) players
Baseball executives
Baseball players from New Jersey
Baseball players from Richmond, Virginia
Boston Red Sox executives
Boston Red Sox players
Boston Red Sox managers
Boston Red Sox scouts
Cincinnati Reds players
Houston Astros players
Houston Colt .45s players
Linden High School (New Jersey) alumni
Louisville Colonels (minor league) managers
Major League Baseball scouting directors
Major League Baseball scouts
Major League Baseball shortstops
Major League Baseball third basemen
National League All-Stars
People from Linden, New Jersey
Richmond Virginians (minor league) players
Rochester Red Wings players
St. Louis Cardinals players
Schenectady Blue Jays players
Sportspeople from Elizabeth, New Jersey
Sportspeople from Union County, New Jersey
Suffolk Goobers players
Toronto Maple Leafs (International League) managers